Guangzhou (168) is the lead ship of Type 052B destroyer of the People's Liberation Army Navy. She was commissioned on 15 July 2004.

Development and design 

Type 052B multirole missile destroyer was the first Chinese-built warship capable of area air defence. The displacement of the Type 052B is about 5850 tons standard and 6500 tons full load. The ship features a "low point" design and combines this with radar absorbing paint to reduce radar signature. The ship's funnel incorporates cooling devices to reduce infrared signatures. The stern flight deck can host a Kamov Ka-28 ASW helicopter.

Construction and career 
Guangzhou was launched on 20 May 2002 at the Jiangnan Shipyard in Shanghai. She was commissioned on 15 July 2004.

On March 5, 2009, Guangzhou arrived in Karachi, Pakistan with Chinese naval special forces, and joined the navies from 12 countries including the United States, Britain, France, Australia, Japan, Pakistan, Bangladesh, Malaysia, Kuwait, Nigeria and Turkey. They participated in the Peace 2009 multi-country maritime joint military exercise. The exercise includes two parts: a port and shore special forces exercise and a maritime military exercise. The exercise lasts for 8 days. After the exercise, Guangzhou set sail back home on March 14, and arrived at a military port in Sanya, Hainan Province on March 26. On August 16, 2009, Guangzhou arrived at Bitong Port in Manado, Indonesia, and began a four-day goodwill visit. During the period, Guangzhou and 28 naval ships from 14 countries participated in the international fleet inspection to celebrate the 64th anniversary of Indonesian independence. On August 10, Guangzhou arrived at the port of Muara, Brunei, and began a four-day friendly visit. After ending the visit to the two countries, Guangzhou returned to its station on August 24.

On March 4, 2010, Guangzhou and Weishanhu formed the fifth escort fleet of the People's Liberation Army Navy. They set sail from a military port terminal in Sanya City, Hainan Province, and went to the Gulf of Aden and the waters of Somalia to replace the fourth escort fleet. Perform escort missions. The escort mission lasted 192 days and nights, with a voyage of 92,495 nautical miles. Guangzhou successively verified 85 batches of 370 ships driven away from suspicious ships, and accompanied 41 batches of 588 Chinese and foreign merchant ships. After the escort was over, Guangzhou and Chaohu, which arrived in advance and performed the escort mission, also visited Egypt, Italy, Greece, Myanmar and other four countries, and docked in Singapore. On September 11, 2010, Guangzhou's fleet returned to the station.

Gallery

References 

2002 ships
Ships built in China
Type 052B destroyers